Sidi Moussa is a commune in the Baraki District of the Algiers Province and a suburb of the city of Algiers in northern Algeria.

History 
The commune was heavily struck by the Algerian Civil War: In 1993 and 1994 death squads conducted killings, in January 1997 there were further murders and in August 1997 the Rais massacre took place.

References

Suburbs of Algiers
Communes of Algiers Province
Cities in Algeria
Algeria